Community Unit School District 303 may refer to:
 La Moille Community Unit School District 303 in Bureau County, Illinois
 St. Charles Community Unit School District 303 in Kane County and DuPage County, Illinois